is a Japanese bobsledder. He competed in the two man event at the 1980 Winter Olympics.

References

1953 births
Living people
Japanese male bobsledders
Olympic bobsledders of Japan
Bobsledders at the 1980 Winter Olympics
Sportspeople from Hokkaido